Jerry T. Carter (born April 10, 1952) is an American politician. He is a member of the South Carolina House of Representatives from the 3rd District, serving since 2020. He is a member of the Republican party.

Electoral history
In his 2020 run for the South Carolina House of Representatives, Carter received endorsements from the Conservation Voters of South Carolina, the South Carolina Fund for Children, Pickens County sheriff Rick Clark, and Clemson mayor J.C. Cook III, among others.

References

Living people
1952 births
Republican Party members of the South Carolina House of Representatives
21st-century American politicians
Barton College alumni
People from Raleigh, North Carolina